Pavel Složil and Renáta Tomanová were the defending champions but lost in the semifinals to Bob Hewitt and Wendy Turnbull.

Bob Hewitt and Wendy Turnbull won in the final 6–3, 2–6, 6–1 against Ion Țiriac and Virginia Ruzici.

Seeds

Draw

Finals

Top half

Bottom half

References

External links
1979 French Open – Doubles draws and results at the International Tennis Federation

Mixed Doubles
French Open by year – Mixed doubles